Leif Eriksen (4 June 1909 – 3 February 1970) was a Norwegian footballer. He played in one match for the Norway national football team in 1935.

References

External links
 

1909 births
1970 deaths
Norwegian footballers
Norway international footballers
Footballers from Bergen
Association football midfielders
SK Brann players